Andrea Salvatore Cocco (born 8 April 1986) is an Italian footballer who plays as a striker for  club AlbinoLeffe.

Club career

Cagliari
Cocco made his Serie A debut on 21 December 2005 for Cagliari in a 1–0 defeat away to Parma F.C. On 31 January 2007 he left for Venezia. and on 31 August 2007 for Pistoiese.

Cocco was sold to Rovigo in a co-ownership deal in August 2008. In June 2009 Cagliari bought Cocco and Andrea Peana (from Triestina) back, but sold them to Alghero immediately in co-ownership deals (later Simone Aresti also joined), where Cocco also met ex-team-mate Alessio Cossu, Nicola Lai and Enrico Cotza (in January). In June 2010, few week before the bankrupt of Alghero, Cagliari bought back Cocco and Aresti for €500.

AlbinoLeffe
Few days after Cagliari signed Gabriele Perico and Simon Laner from AlbinoLeffe in temporary deals for €750,000 (€375,000 each), Cocco was sold to AlbinoLeffe in co-ownership deal for €50,000 in a 3-year deal, making Cagliari only paid AlbinoLeffe €700,000 in cash. In June 2011 Cagliari bought back Cocco for €150,000, as well as bought Perico in a co-ownership deal for €375,000, making Cagliari paid AlbinoLeffe €500,000 cash that summer.

On 4 July 2011 Cocco returned to AlbinoLeffe in a temporary deal with option to sign outright for €200,000. Despite the club relegated, the option was excised in a 4-year contract. On the same day Perico was acquired outright for another €200,000, thus the two transfer fees were canceled each other. However, Cocco was sold by AlbinoLeffe in the same summer.

Verona and loans
On 30 July 2012, Cocco was signed by Hellas Verona in a co-ownership deal with AlbinoLeffe, for €290,000 fee in a 3-year contract. In June 2013 the co-ownership deal was renewed.

After a one-year stint with Verona in August 2013, he joined Reggina on a loan deal. On 29 January 2014, he was again loaned to Portuguese Segunda Liga side Beira-Mar.

In June 2014 Verona acquired Cocco and Laner outright from AlbinoLeffe for €500 each, with Simone Calvano returned to Verona also for €500.

Vicenza 
He moved to Vicenza on 8 August 2014 in a 2-year contract on a free transfer. He missed few weeks of 2015–16 Serie B due to an injury in pre-season.

Pescara and loans
On 31 August 2015 Cocco was signed by fellow Serie B club Pescara on a reported 3-year contract for a transfer fee of €600,000. On 3 August 2016 Cocco was loaned to fellow Serie B club Frosinone (with option to buy), which the team was relegated from Serie A. After scoring just 1 league goal for the Lazio-based club, Cocco was loaned to another Serie B team Cesena on 16 January 2017. He wore number 11 shirt for his new team. On 31 January 2019, he was released from his Pescara contract by mutual consent.

Padova
On 27 February 2019, he signed with Padova.

Olbia
On 19 November 2019, he signed a contract with Olbia until 30 June 2021.

Seregno
On 20 August 2021, he joined Serie C club Seregno.

Return to AlbinoLeffe
On 9 August 2022, Cocco returned to AlbinoLeffe.

References

External links

 

1986 births
Living people
Sportspeople from Cagliari
Footballers from Sardinia
Italian footballers
Association football forwards
Serie A players
Serie B players
Serie C players
Cagliari Calcio players
Venezia F.C. players
U.S. Pistoiese 1921 players
Rovigo Calcio players
U.C. AlbinoLeffe players
Hellas Verona F.C. players
Reggina 1914 players
L.R. Vicenza players
Delfino Pescara 1936 players
Frosinone Calcio players
A.C. Cesena players
Calcio Padova players
Olbia Calcio 1905 players
U.S. 1913 Seregno Calcio players
Liga Portugal 2 players
S.C. Beira-Mar players
Italian expatriate footballers
Expatriate footballers in Portugal
Italian expatriate sportspeople in Portugal